Jaclyn Michelle Linetsky (January 8, 1986 – September 8, 2003) was a Canadian actress who played Megan O'Connor on 15/Love and the title character on Caillou during the show's second and third seasons, replacing the character's original voice actor, Bryn McAuley, who voiced the character in the first season of the show. After Linetsky's death in 2003, Annie Bovaird was cast to replace her, who voiced the character until the original series ended in 2010.

Early life 
Jaclyn Michelle Linetsky was born on January 8, 1986, at the Jewish General Hospital to religious Jewish parents, Terry (née Weiner) and Larry Linetsky. She was the youngest of three children and had two older siblings, Kelly and Derek. She was of Russian-Jewish descent. Linetsky was raised in Dollard-des-Ormeaux, then moved to Hampstead, a suburb in Montreal, Quebec. She graduated from St. George's School of Montreal in 2003 where she made a speech at the graduation ceremony.

Career 
Linetsky began acting at age eight, performing in theatre productions. Her first major gig was in a milk radio advertisement at age 10. 

Linetsky provided the voice of the title character in the animated series Caillou from 2000 until her death in 2003. She also provided the voices for Bitzi in the animated series Daft Planet (2002); Lori Mackney in the second season of What's with Andy? (2003–2004) replacing US voice actress Colleen O'Shaughnessey; Kit on Kit & Kaboodle, Shei-Hu, his cousin Shei-He, and a large group of other mice on Sagwa, the Chinese Siamese Cat; Yukari on Tommy & Oscar; Brenda on Rotten Ralph and Meg in Mega Babies. 

Other roles in voice acting included, The Kids from Room 402, Wunschpunsch, The Country Mouse and the City Mouse Adventures, Simon in the Land of Chalk Drawings, Jim Button and video games Alex Builds His Farm and Evolution Worlds. 

In 2003, Linetsky was cast in the tennis-circuit-themed dramatic series 15/Love on YTV. Her character, Megan O'Connor, was mutually falling in love with co-star Vadim Schneider's character, Sebastien Dubé.

Death 
On September 8, 2003, Linetsky and Vadim Schneider were on their way to the set of 15/Love in St. Cesaire, Quebec, in a Dodge Caravan. For unknown reasons, the Dodge Caravan went off its original trajectory around 12:15 P.M. to go through the middle band of the highway and found itself in the wrong direction on Highway 10 West. The van then swerved into oncoming traffic, crossed the median, and struck a 20-foot semi-truck head on, causing the vehicle to burst into flames.

Schneider was killed instantly upon the impact of the collision, and less than two hours after, along with the combined factors of trauma, severe injuries and burns, Linetsky, who had been unconscious on impact, went into cardiac arrest and was pronounced dead at the Pierre Boucher Hospital in Longueuil, Quebec. They were both 17 years old.

On the day of Schneider and Linetsky's deaths, filming for 15/Love was cancelled and filming went on a two week hiatus citing a desire to speak with their families.

The writers of 15/Love eventually  decided that Linetsky's and Schneider's characters Megan O'Connor and Sebastien Dubé would be killed off in a plane crash off the coast of the Isle of Wight, England, after a tennis tournament.

Following her death, Linetsky was replaced by Eleanor Noble as the voice of Lori Mackney in What's with Andy?, and by Annie Bovaird as the voice of Caillou.

In a statement, Stuart Snyder, President and CEO of Cinar Corporation, wrote: "Jaclyn's voice enchanted thousands of children and viewers and she brought her own special personality and character to Caillou. She was a very talented performer and will be deeply missed by us all."

"On behalf of everyone at CINAR, I want to express our most sincere and heartfelt sympathies to Jaclyn's family."

Tributes 
The episode of What's with Andy? entitled "Nurse Jen" was dedicated to her memory, as was the 15/Love episode entitled "Curveballs P.1" and the Caillou film Caillou's Holiday Movie. The very last episode of 15/Love was also dedicated to her memory. In 2009, St. George's School of Montreal, Linetsky's alma mater, renamed their performing arts program "The Jaclyn Linetsky Performing Arts Program" in her honour.

Filmography

Animation

Live-action

Film

Video games

References

External links 

1986 births
2003 deaths
Accidental deaths in Quebec
Anglophone Quebec people
Burials in Quebec
Canadian child actresses
Jewish Canadian actresses
Canadian voice actresses
Actresses from Montreal
Road incident deaths in Canada
People from Hampstead, Quebec
20th-century Canadian actresses
21st-century Canadian actresses